Mandar Parvat, also known as Mandar Hill is a small mountain situated in Banka district under Bhagalpur division of state of Bihar. It is about 700 ft high and approximately 45 km south of Bhagalpur city of Bounsi, a place located on the state highway between Bhagalpur and Dumka. Mandar Hill is a great place of pilgrimage although it is not so well known now. On top of the hill are a Jain and a Hindu temple. A carnival is organised every year at Mahavir Jayanti & Makar Sakranti.

Religious Significance

Hinduism 

The mountain has many references in Hindu Mythology as Mandarachal Parvat. As per references found in the Puranas and the Mahabharata, this hill was used for churning the ocean to extract the nectar from its bosom (Samudra Manthan). There is, adjacent to this hill, a pond called "Paapharni". This holy pond has its own historical significance. It is a place where you can revive yourself after taking a bath in the pond that refreshes you mentally and physically. In the middle of the pond is a temple of Lord Vishnu and Goddess Lakshmi.

Many rare sculptures of Lord Shiva, Kamadhenu and Varaha, believed to be of 11-12th century AD, can be found to be scattered around Mandar Hill. These rare artifacts need to be conserved by Archaeological Survey of India.

Jainism 
Mandar Parvat, is believed to place of three out of five kalnayak — diksha, kevala jnana, and nirvana of Vasupujya, the twelfth tirthankara in Jainism.

Gallery

References

Citations

Sources

External links

Tourist attractions in Bihar
Mountains of Bihar
Hindu pilgrimage sites in India